Orava is a village in Võru Parish, Võru County, South East Estonia.

Orava railway station on Tartu-Pechory railway line is located around 3 km north of the village. It is second station on the Edelaraudtee Koidula - Tartu route.

Gallery

References

Villages in Võru County
Kreis Werro